Agnė Šerkšnienė (Orlauskaitė) (born 18 February 1988) is a Lithuanian sprinter, who specializes in the 400m. In July 2018 at La Chaux-de-Fonds she ran her personal best and a national record of 50.99. She has also set national records in 200m 22.99 at Zofingen in July 2018 and 400m indoors 52.33 at Glasgow in March 2019.

Achievements

References

1988 births
Living people
Lithuanian female sprinters
Sportspeople from Kaunas
Competitors at the 2011 Summer Universiade
Athletes (track and field) at the 2020 Summer Olympics
Olympic athletes of Lithuania
Olympic female sprinters